Marhab bin Al-Harith was popularly known as the Knight of Khaybar, a Jewish knight who is noted for his military role in Battle of Khaybar.

Life
Beside his knighthood and excellence in war, he was a poet, Tall and huge, brave, and wealthy.

Ancestry
According to some historians he and his sister were from Israelite origin, while some other historians believed he is from Ḥimyarite origin.

Property
He had a sword engraved on it the phrase "This is the sword of Marhab; he who tastes it dies". and he resides in a palace.

Battle of Khaybar
The Battle of Khaybar was fought in the year 628 between Muslims and the Jews living in the oasis of Khaybar. Marhab was the commander of the Jewish army in that battle and expressed an outstanding strength and skills. The Muslim historian Shaykh Mufid stated: "No one amongst the Muslims could confront him but Ali ibn Abi Talib killed him in the battlefield".

Death
Marhab's mother was a fortune-teller, she predicted that no man can kill Marhab but one man named after a synonymous of lion.
A night before his last battle he saw in his dream that a lion attacked him.

Historians have given different descriptions about the incident of killing Marhab. According Sahih Muslim, Ali went to meet Marhab in a single combat. Marhab advanced brandishing his sword and chanting: "Khaibar knows certainly that I am Marhab, a fully armed and well-tried valorous warrior (hero) when war comes spreading its flames". Ali chanted in reply: I am the one whose mother named him Haidar, (synonymous of lion) like a lion of the forest with a terror-striking countenance".  The narrator said: Ali struck at the head of Marhab and killed him, so the victory (capture of Khaibar) was due to him.
Al-Maqrizi recorded: "The Ansari reported that he saw Marhab's mother holding his dead body and weeping".

References

628 deaths
7th-century Arabian Jews
Jewish poets
Jewish military personnel
Opponents of Muhammad